Sinem is a Turkish feminine given name.

 Sinem Barut (born 1986), Turkish volleyball player
Sinem Balık (born 1974), Turkish opera singer
Sinem Banna (born 1968), Turkish-American artist
 Sinem Doğu (born 1987), Turkish female ice hockey player
 Sinem Kobal (born 1987), Turkish television and film actress
Sinem Öztürk, Turkish actress and presenter
Sinem Saban, Australian film writer, producer, director, and human rights activist
Sinem Ünsal, Turkish actress

See also 

 Akap Sinem, Turkish volleyball player

Turkish feminine given names